What the Butler Saw is a phrase that relates to voyeurism. It can also relate to;

Film 
 What the Butler Saw (mutoscope), a 1900s erotic film shown on a viewing machine
 What the Butler Saw (1924 film), by George Dewhurst, Edward Mouillot, and Edward Parry
 What the Butler Saw (1950 film), by Donald and Roger Good, directed by Godfrey Grayson

Other 
 What the Butler Saw (play), 1967 play by Joe Orton, first produced on the stage in 1969, two years after Orton's death
 "What the Butler Saw" (The Avengers), 1966 episode of The Avengers
 What the Butler Saw (TV series), a British reality show